Anna Margaret Windsor (born 17 May 1976) is an Australian former competitive swimmer who won four medals in freestyle relays at the world championships in 1993, 1995 and 1998. She also competed at the 1996 and 2000 Summer Olympics and finished sixth in the 4×100-metre freestyle relay in 1996.

She was born in Sydney, but her family moved to Orange, New South Wales when she was eight months old.  After the 2000 Olympics, she retired from swimming to focus on her studies.  She received a university degree in medicine in 2004. 

She is the Regional Head of General Practice training for Western NSW.

She has a son, born in 2006, and a daughter, born in 2008.

References

External links
 Orange City – Sporting hall of fame

1976 births
Living people
Australian female medley swimmers
Australian female freestyle swimmers
Swimmers at the 1996 Summer Olympics
Swimmers at the 2000 Summer Olympics
Olympic swimmers of Australia
World Aquatics Championships medalists in swimming
Medalists at the FINA World Swimming Championships (25 m)
Swimmers at the 1994 Commonwealth Games
Swimmers at the 1998 Commonwealth Games
Commonwealth Games medallists in swimming
Commonwealth Games gold medallists for Australia
People from Orange, New South Wales
Sportswomen from New South Wales
Medallists at the 1994 Commonwealth Games
Medallists at the 1998 Commonwealth Games